Jusoh is a Malaysian surname that may refer to
Che Mohamad Zulkifly Jusoh, Malaysian politician 
Idris Jusoh (born 1955), Malaysian politician 
Khairil Annas Jusoh, Malay author and academician 
Matulidi Jusoh (1957–2015), Malaysian politician 
Shukur Jusoh (born 1989), Malaysian footballer 
Siti Munirah Jusoh (born 1987), Malaysian squash player
Rozman Jusoh, Malaysian drug trafficker